Leonardo Nascimento Lopes de Souza (born 28 May 1997), known as Léo Souza or simply Leonardo, is a Brazilian professional footballer who plays as a striker for K League 1 club Ulsan Hyundai on loan from Chinese Super League club Shandong Taishan.

Career
Léo Souza grew in the Santos youth ranks and then he was loaned to the B-team, where he scored three goals in 16 games. Gainare Tottori wanted to scout him, so GM Masayuki Okano and returning Fernandinho went to Brazil to see with their own eyes the striker and another player, Vitor Gabriel. In January 2018, the Tottori-based club signed both class '97 for their incoming 2018 season.

After a top-scorer season with Albirex Niigata, scoring 28 goals in the 2019 J2 League, the Brazilian striker signed for Urawa Red Diamonds in the J1 League.

Urawa Red Diamonds
Léo Souza made his debut for Urawa in the club's match against Vegalta Sendai in the 2020 J.League Cup group stage on 16 February 2020. He scored twice in the first-half as Urawa won 5–2. He made his league debut five days later and scored the club's second goal of a 3–2 away victory at Shonan Bellmare.

Shandong Taishan
On 22 February 2021, Léo Souza joined Chinese Super League club Shandong Taishan.

On 30 July 2021, Léo Souza joined fellow Chinese Super League club Hebei F.C. on loan.

On 24 February 2022, Léo Souza joined K League 1 club Ulsan Hyundai on loan.

Club statistics
.

Honours

Club
Ulsan Hyundai
 K League 1: 2022

Individual
J2 League top scorer: 2019 (28 goals)
J3 League top scorer: 2018 (24 goals)

References

External links
 Leonardo at data.j-league.or.jp 
 Leonardo at www.jleague.jp (archived) 
 Leonardo at Gainare Tottori 

1997 births
Living people
Footballers from São Paulo (state)
Brazilian footballers
Association football forwards
Ituano FC players
Santos FC players
Esporte Clube Rio Verde players
Gainare Tottori players
Albirex Niigata players
Urawa Red Diamonds players
Shandong Taishan F.C. players
Hebei F.C. players
K League 1 players
Chinese Super League players
J1 League players
J2 League players
J3 League players
Brazilian expatriate footballers
Brazilian expatriate sportspeople in Japan
Brazilian expatriate sportspeople in China
Brazilian expatriate sportspeople in South Korea
Expatriate footballers in Japan
Expatriate footballers in China
Expatriate footballers in South Korea